Brisbane 2032 (Turrbal: Meeanjin 2032) is a successful bid for the 2032 Summer Olympics by the city of Brisbane and the Australian Olympic Committee. On 10 June 2021, the bid won IOC board approval and is expected to host the 2032 Summer Olympics. Brisbane officially received the rights to host the Olympics on 21 July 2021. Brisbane became the first host city to win the bid unopposed since 1984.

History

Following the success of the 2018 Commonwealth Games on the Gold Coast, Queensland, President of the Australian Olympic Committee (AOC) John Coates said he strongly supported a bid from Queensland for the 2032 Summer Olympics and Paralympics. Following speculation, a feasibility study was also commissioned by the Southeast Queensland Council of Mayors with the outcome due back by the end of 2018. A 2019 feasibility study commissioned by South-East Queensland Council of Mayors back in 2016, and investigated by French company Lagardère on South East Queensland's eligibility to host the 2032 Olympic games concluded the region was capable of hosting the event, and that infrastructure and transport upgrades already needed would provide a financial return. The feasibility report notes that 80 per cent of the venues needed for such a bid already exist across the south-east, with others predicted to be constructed before 2032 in line with community needs. The document suggests Brisbane would be host of 21 Olympic venues, the Gold Coast and the Sunshine Coast would both host 5 venues, with the remaining 7 venues to be hosted within the SEQ region. SEQ Mayors including then Brisbane Lord Mayor Graham Quirk made emphasis on the need to make the games cost effective through reusing existing facilities and using the event as a catalyst for infrastructure and job creation. A feasibility study which was published in February forecasted that $900 million of state and federal funds would be needed to help host the 2032 Olympics and Paralympics. On 1 July 2019, Prime Minister Scott Morrison, made an announcement that the Federal government would be officially supporting the Queensland Olympic bid, saying the government "will be there every step of the way". On 13 July 2019, the Prime Minister put forward 10 million dollars towards the bid, as well as nominating Queensland LNP federal MP Ted O'Brien to help with the bid on behalf of the Commonwealth. Queensland Premier Annastacia Palaszczuk announced on 9 December 2019 that the state will make an official and regional bid for the 2032 Olympic Games with proposed dates of 23 July to 8 August. On 24 February 2021, Brisbane was chosen by the IOC to be a preferred candidate city to host the 2032 Olympics.

Previous Bids
Australia has hosted the Olympic Games twice in 1956 in Melbourne and in 2000 in Sydney. Brisbane made a previous bid for the Summer Games in 1992 which was held in Barcelona.

Major sport events in Brisbane and surrounding areas

Brisbane has the following experience of hosting major sports events as well as high profile international events. 
 1957 Rugby League World Cup in Sydney and Brisbane
 1968 Rugby League World Cup in Sydney, Brisbane and Auckland
 1976 Finn World Championships in Brisbane
 1977 Rugby League World Cup in Sydney, Brisbane, Auckland and Christchurch
 1982 Commonwealth Games in Brisbane
 1987 Rugby World Cup some events in Brisbane
 1987 Pan Pacific Swimming Championships in Brisbane
 1988 World Junior Figure Skating Championships in Brisbane
 1988 World Amateur Bodybuilding Championship
 1989 BMX World Championships in Brisbane
 1991 470 World Championships in Brisbane
 1992 Cricket World Cup some events in Brisbane
 1994 World Masters Games in Brisbane
 1994 World Artistic Gymnastics Championships in Brisbane
 1996 World Junior Figure Skating Championships in Brisbane
 2000 Summer Olympics - Football, with multiple games being played in Brisbane
 2001 Goodwill Games in Brisbane (with some events on the Gold Coast)
 2001 World Masters Athletics Championships in Brisbane
 2003 Rugby World Cup some events in Brisbane
 2008 Rugby League World Cup some events in Brisbane and Gold Coast
 2008 Women's Rugby League World Cup in Brisbane and the Sunshine Coast
 2012 Men's Laser Radial World Championship in Brisbane
 2015 Asian Cup some events in Brisbane
 2015 Cricket World Cup some events in Brisbane
 2017 Rugby League World Cup some events in Brisbane
 2017 Women's Rugby League World Cup in Sydney and Brisbane
 2018 Commonwealth Games on the Gold Coast (with some events in Brisbane)
 2023 FIFA Women's World Cup some events in Brisbane

Venues

Accommodation
Two athlete's villages are envisaged: 
 Albion in Brisbane, and
 Gold Coast.

References

Further reading 
 

 

2032 Summer Olympics bids
Sport in Brisbane
2032 Summer Paralympics